Plyushchiny is a rural locality (a selo) in Prokhorovsky District, Belgorod Oblast, Russia. The population was 108 as of 2010. There are 4 streets.

Geography 
Plyushchiny is located 31 km east of Prokhorovka (the district's administrative centre) by road. Kholodnoye is the nearest rural locality.

References 

Rural localities in Prokhorovsky District